The Spokane River is a tributary of the Columbia River, approximately  long, in northern Idaho and eastern Washington in the United States. It drains a low mountainous area east of the Columbia, passing through the Spokane Valley and the city of Spokane, Washington.

Description

From Lake Coeur d'Alene, the Spokane River traverses the Rathdrum Prairie until reaching Post Falls, Idaho where it passes over a dam, and a natural 40-foot waterfall. Continuing westward it passes over 6 more dams, three of which (Upriver Dam, Upper Falls Dam, Monroe Street Dam) are located in the city of Spokane. In Spokane, it flows over the Spokane Falls, which are located in the heart of Downtown Spokane, approximately one third of the way down the river's length. About a mile later, the river receives Latah Creek from the southeast. Soon afterwards, it is met from the northeast by the Little Spokane River, on the western edge of the city of Spokane. It flows in a zigzag course along the southern edge of the Selkirk Mountains, forming the southern boundary of the Spokane Indian Reservation, where it is impounded by the Long Lake Dam to form Long Lake, a  reservoir.  It joins Franklin D. Roosevelt Lake on the Columbia from the east at Miles. The site of historic Fort Spokane is located at the confluence of the Spokane and Columbia rivers.

Human use
Until the 18th century, the Coeur d'Alene (Schḭtsu'umsh) and Spokane Native Americans (along with other Salish peoples) used to live and travel along the banks of the Spokane River.
In 1807, David Thompson was the first European to cross the Rocky Mountains and explore the area.

Today, the Spokane metropolitan area (population 573,493) is the largest human settlement on the banks of the Spokane River. The metropolitan area of Coeur d'Alene (pop. 170,628) is immediately to the east and upstream of the Spokane metropolitan area. The Spokane River and Lake Coeur d'Alene are the primary sources of recharge for the Spokane Valley–Rathdrum Prairie Aquifer, which is the primary source of drinking water for each of these settlements.

Pollution
The Spokane River contains some of the highest concentrations of heavy metals of any river in the state, resulting from pollution coming from Lake Coeur D'Alene and traveling from the Bunker Hill Mine and Smelting Complex Superfund site.

Spokane's sewage treatment facilities empty their outflow into the Spokane River. In 1889, Spokane built a sewage system that dumped raw sewage directly into the river, which was visibly noticeable by 1920. In 1957 a primary treatment facility was installed; however, this was soon deemed inadequate by the Washington State Department of Ecology. This led to the construction of a more advanced treatment plant that utilized chemical precipitation technology, which was connected in 1975, and operational by 1977.

Fish habitat

After the Northern Pacific Railway lines arrived in Spokane in 1882, there was rapid growth in milling operations along the river. Many of these mills required dams to provide power for their machinery. As a result of the dams blocking the river, salmon populations in the Spokane plummeted, leading to complaints from many of the people living upstream. After the construction of Little Falls Dam in 1910 by Washington Water Power blocked upstream passage, the river's salmon populations disappeared completely.

Steelhead were also abundant on the Spokane River, prior to pollution and the construction of the dams. Today, the Spokane River system is one of the two largest unoccupied stretches of steelhead habitat within their former range.

Today, the Spokane River supports populations of rainbow trout, northern pikeminnow, and Bridgelip Suckers (Catostomus columbianus), as well as several non-native species. Many of the remaining fish, however, are not suitable for human consumption due to the chemical pollution in the river, with signs alongside the river warning that the fish are contaminated with PCBs.

Crossings

See also
Bunker Hill Mine and Smelting Complex
List of Idaho rivers
List of longest streams of Idaho
List of Washington rivers
Spokane River Centennial Trail
North Idaho Centennial Trail
Harker Canyon

References

Bibliography

Further reading

External links

Spokane River at night
USGS: Spokane River Basin
Spokane River: 6th Most Endangered River of 2004

Geography of Spokane, Washington
Rivers of Idaho
Rivers of Washington (state)
Tributaries of the Columbia River
Rivers of Spokane County, Washington
Rivers of Lincoln County, Washington
Rivers of Stevens County, Washington
Rivers of Kootenai County, Idaho